The 7th European Women's Artistic Gymnastics Championships were held in Landskrona, Sweden in May 1969.

Medalists

References 

1969
European Artistic Gymnastics Championships
European Women's Artistic Gymnastics Championships
International gymnastics competitions hosted by Sweden
European Women's Artistic Gymnastics Championships
May 1969 sports events in Europe
Sport in Landskrona
Euro
Sports competitions in Skåne County